Uplands Park is a village in St. Louis County, Missouri, United States. The population was 445 at the 2010 census. The village is one of many small  majority black communities located in the Natural Bridge corridor of mid-St. Louis County, characterized by small homes on small lots.

Geography

Demographics

2010 census
As of the census of 2010, there were 445 people, 168 households, and 127 families living in the village. The racial makeup of the village was 2.0% White, 96.4% African American, 1.1% Native American, and 0.4% from other races. Hispanic or Latino of any race were 1.1% of the population.

There were 168 households, of which 32.1% had children under the age of 18 living with them, 36.9% were married couples living together, 31.0% had a female householder with no husband present, 7.7% had a male householder with no wife present, and 24.4% were non-families. 20.2% of all households were made up of individuals, and 8.9% had someone living alone who was 65 years of age or older. The average household size was 2.65 and the average family size was 3.04.

The median age in the village was 45.2 years. 21.8% of residents were under the age of 18; 7.8% were between the ages of 18 and 24; 20.1% were from 25 to 44; 30.4% were from 45 to 64; and 20% were 65 years of age or older. The gender makeup of the village was 44.7% male and 55.3% female.

2000 census
As of the census of 2000, there were 460 people, 166 households, and 129 families living in the village. The racial makeup of the village was 1.30% White, 97.39% African American, 0.22% Asian, and 1.09% from two or more races. Hispanic or Latino of any race were 0.87% of the population.

There were 166 households, out of which 20.5% had children under the age of 18 living with them, 45.2% were married couples living together, 24.7% had a female householder with no husband present, and 21.7% were non-families. 18.7% of all households were made up of individuals, and 9.6% had someone living alone who was 65 years of age or older. The average household size was 2.77 and the average family size was 3.05.

In the village, the population was spread out, with 24.3% under the age of 18, 5.9% from 18 to 24, 22.0% from 25 to 44, 30.9% from 45 to 64, and 17.0% who were 65 years of age or older. The median age was 43 years. For every 100 females, there were 98.3 males. For every 100 females age 18 and over, there were 88.1 males.

The median income for a household in the village was $49,286, and the median income for a family was $54,250. Males had a median income of $28,333 versus $25,114 for females. The per capita income for the village was $17,041. About 3.9% of families and 4.8% of the population were below the poverty line, including 3.6% of those under age 18 and 5.8% of those age 65 or over.

References

Villages in St. Louis County, Missouri
Villages in Missouri